Sarbat Khalsa (lit. meaning all the Khalsa; Punjabi:  (Gurumukhi)), was a biannual deliberative assembly (on the same lines as a Parliament in a Direct Democracy) of the Sikhs held at Amritsar in Panjab during the 18th century. It literally translates to the "entire Sikh Nation" but as a political institution it refers to the meetings of the Dal Khalsa, Sikh Misls, and the legislature of the Sikh Empire. The first Sarbat Khalsa was called by the tenth guru, Guru Gobind Singh before his death in 1708 and the tradition of calling Sarbat Khalsa has continued ever since at times of hardship or conflict. After the demolition of the Mahant System by the Khalsa Panth, S. Kartar Singh Jhabbar called the Sarbat Khalsa in 1920. He was not the Jathedar of the Akal Takht but a Sikh leader. In the resolution of that Sarbat Khalsa, Teja Singh Bhuchhar was announced as the Jathedar of the Akal Takht. The next known meeting of the Sarbat Khalsa took place on the occasion of Divali in 1723 when a clash between Tat Khalsa and the Bandais (owing fealty to Banda Singh Bahadur) was averted and amicably settled through the intervention and wise counsel of Bhai Mani Singh.

The next notable Sarbat Khalsa, which was held soon after the martyrdom of Bhai Tara Singh Wan in 1726, passed a Gurmata (the decisions of the Sarbat Khalsa), laying down a threefold plan of action: to plunder government treasures in transit between local and regional offices and the central treasury; to raid government armouries for weapons and government stables for horses and carriages; and to eliminate government informers and lackeys.

Another Sarbat Khalsa assembled in 1733 to deliberate upon and accept the government's offer of a Nawabship and jagir to the Panth. Under a gurmata of the Sarbat Khalsa on 14 October (Divali day) 1745, the active fighting force of the Sikhs was reorganized into 25 jathas (bands) of about 100 each.

A further reorganization into 11 misls (divisions) forming the Dal Khalsa was made by the Sarbat Khalsa on Baisakhi, 29 March 1748. Thus, Sarbat Khalsa became the central body of what J.D. Cunningham, in his book, A history of the Sikhs, terms a “theocratic confederate feudalism” established by the misls. On 29 April 1986, a Sarbat Khalsa at the Golden Temple declared the rebuilding of Akal Takht.

History
After the death of Banda Singh Bahadur in 1716 the Khalsa was in disarray. After 1716, the Mughal government began a campaign of genocide against Sikhs led by Abdus Samad Khan and later his son Zakariya Khan that was carried out by in the form of a standing army dedicated to eliminating Sikhs, daily public executions, and monetary rewards for the heads of killed Sikhs. The Dal Khalsa "retaliated by killing government functionaries and plundering Mughal posts, arsenals, and treasuries". In 1733, because of the failure of the Mughal government to subdue the Sikhs they were offered a jagir in 1733. Nawab Kapur Singh was appointed head of the Dal Khalsa and he reorganized the Sikhs into the Taruna Dal and Budda Dal. The Taruna Dal formed the basis of the Sikh Misls.

Maharaja Ranjit Singh banned the Sarbat Khalsa in 1805 but it has recently been revived.

Procedure

Meetings of the Sarbat Khalsa began with an Ardās, a Sikh prayer for guidance. The body then chose Panj Piare, or five members, to act as the governing body of the mass meeting. To become one of the Panj Piare members would have to be nominated, answer objections from the assembly, and be subject to a direct vote. After their election the Panj Piare sat next to the Guru Granth Sahib on the Akal Takht of Harmandir Sahib. Members put proposals up for consideration and the Panj Piare intervened in disputes that came up during the assembly. A proposal passed by the Sarbat Khalsa, known as a Gurmata (The Guru's decision) was binding on all Sikhs.

Sarbat Khalsa 2015 
Sarbat Khalsa 2015 was held on November 10, 2015 in Chabba village on the outskirts of Amritsar, with the purpose to strengthen all Sikh institutions and traditions. As many as 550,000 to over 600,000 Sikhs from around the world attended the event. A few Sikh organizations in support of the Shiromani Akali Dal did not attend the event and refused to recognize the resolutions passed. The event was also opposed by Punjab Chief Minister Parkash Singh Badal and his Party Akali dal. But Few Sikh organizations supported to Sarbat Khalsa attended the event and recognized the resolutions passed. The event was called by Simranjit Singh Mann and Mohkam Singh, leaders of Shiromani Akali Dal (Amritsar) and United Akali Dal respectively. The Sikh congregation passed 13 resolutions to be implemented.

Resolutions 
 Absolves the four current Jathedars from their duties: Giani Gurbachan Singh, Giani Mal Singh, Giani Gurmukh Singh, Giani Iqbal Singh. Appoints the following interim Jathedars till Vasiakhi 2016 as follows: Bhai Jagtar Singh Hawara Jathedar (Sri Akal Takht Sahib), Bhai Dhian Singh Mand Acting Jathedar (Sri Akal Takht Sahib), Bhai Amrik Singh Ajnala Jathedar (Sri Kesgarh Sahib) and Bhai Baljit Singh Daduwal Jathedar (Sri Damdama Sahib)
 Reaffirms Akal Takht Sahib is a guru-gifted sovereign Sikh institution which must become fully independent again. A draft committee is to be constituted composed of Sikhs both from the Homeland and Diaspora by 30 Nov 2015 to report on Akal Takht Sahib system which includes Sarbat Khalsa and Jathedars governance and process. Plan to be adopted by Vaisakhi 2016 when next Sarbat Khalsa is to be held.
 Declares Kanwar Pal Singh Gill and Kuldip Singh Brar tankhaiya (chastised) for anti-Sikh genocidal campaigns and summons them at Akal Takht Sahib to present themselves by 30 Nov 2015.
 Finds Prakash Singh Badal, Sukhbir Singh Badal and Avtar Singh Makkar guilty of undermining and misusing the Sikh institutions of Panj Piare and Akal Takht Sahib. Nullifies Prakash Singh Badal's Fakhar-e-Qaum and Panth Rattan and Avtar Singh Makkar's Shiromani Sewak awards.
 Creates World Sikh Parliament to represent global Sikhs under aegis of Akal Takht Sahib. A draft committee is to be constituted of Sikhs both from the Homeland and the Diaspora by 30 Nov 2015 to report on its structure and governance. Plan to be adopted by Vaisakhi 2016.
 Calls on all Sikhs to safeguard sanctity of Guru Granth Sahib and aptly deliver justice, in accordance with the Khalsa traditions, to those disrespecting the eternal Guru.
 Recognizes the Sikh political prisoners as the Sikh nation's assets. Holds the state responsible for the resultant consequences due to Jathedar Surat Singh's struggle. Demands all political prisoners of any movement in India such as Sikhs, Naxalites, Kashmiris, Nagas, and others, be released unconditionally now.
 Revive the Shiromani Gurdwara Parbadhak Committee's democratic representation system to manage the internal Sikh affairs which have been suspended by the state over the years.
 Orders all Sikhs to fully refrain from all internal divisive doctrinal debate until the sovereignty of Akal Takht Sahib is fully restored.
 Recognizes the Sikh nation must establish a unifying independent Sikh calendar.
 Aspires for Vatican-like status for Harmandar Sahib Complex to ensure every Sikh's birthright to visit and deliberate at the Akal Takht Sahib.
 Reaffirms the resolutions adopted by the Sarbat Khalsa held on 26 Jan 1986.
 Embraces the disenfranchised fellow human beings be treated with dignity and respect; appeals to stop the construction of caste-based gurdwaras and cremation grounds.

See also
 Sarv Khap system of Haryana and Uttar Pradesh is similar to Sarbat Khalsa
 Jathedar of Akal Takht
 Gurmata, a term used to refer to resolutions passed by the Sarbat Khalsa
 Hukamnama, an injunction or edict issued by the Sikh gurus, their officiated followers, the Takhts, or taken from the Guru Granth Sahib
 Rakhi system, the protection tax implemented by the Sikh Confederacy

References

Further reading
Volume 2: Evolution of Sikh Confederacies (1708-1769) by Hari Ram Gupta. Munshiram Manoharlal Publishers, 1999, Pages: 383 pages, illustrated.
The Heritage of the Sikhs by Harbans Singh. 1994, .
Sikh Domination of the Mughal Empire. 2000, second edition. .
The Sikh Commonwealth or Rise and Fall of Sikh Misls. 2001, revised edition. .
Maharaja Ranjit Singh, Lord of the Five Rivers by Jean-Marie Lafont. Oxford University Press. 2002, .
History of Panjab by Dr L. M. Joshi and Dr Fauja Singh.

Sikh politics
History of Punjab